Abbo is a male given name (short form of) and a surname (Arabic and Hebrew variant of Abbas).

Abbo may refer to:

Given name
 Abbo I of Metz (died 643), bishop of Metz 
 Abbo II of Metz (died 707), bishop Metz from 697 to 707
 Abbo of Auxerre (died 860), Bishop of Auxerre
 Abbo Cernuus (died c. 992), Benedictine monk and poet
 Abbo of Fleury (c. 945–1004), abbot
 Abbo of Provence, Patrician of Provence in opposition to Maurontus in the 730s
 Abbo (bishop of Soissons) (died 937), Bishop of Soissons
 Abbo Nassour (1927–1982), Chadian politician
 Abbo Ostrowsky (1889–1975), Russian-American art teacher and etcher

Surname
 Catherine Abbo (born 1972), Nigerian researcher, academic, and  medical doctor
Faraj Abbo (1921–1984), Iraqi artist, theatre director, designer, author and educator
 Gabriel Abbo (1883–1954), French politician
 Ishaku Elisha Abbo, Nigerian politician
 Jussuf Abbo (1890–1953), Palestinian-Jewish artist

Other uses
 Abbo, singer and guitarist from UK Decay
 Abbo, another name for the town of Sidi Daoud, Algeria
 An ethnic slur referring to Indigenous Australians (variant of abo, derived from Aborigine)

See also
 Abbas (name) (Arabic)
 Abbon (French)
 Adalbert and Adelbert (German)

Masculine given names